Antonius Rex was an Italian progressive rock band founded in 1974 in Milan by Antonio Bartoccetti. It is the same band as Jacula with a different name.

Biography 

Jacula formed in 1968 and released its debut album, In Cauda Semper Stat Venenum, in 1969. After the release of the 1972 album Tardo Pede In Magiam Versus, the band split up. Bandleader Bartoccetti then formed Antonius Rex in 1974 with new members, releasing eight albums under this name.

In 2011, the Bartoccetti released a new album under the Jacula name, Pre Viam.

Discography 
1977 - Zora
1978 - Ralefun 
1979 - Anno Demoni
1980 - Praeternatural 
1992 - Pig in the witch
2002 - Neque Semper Arcum Tendit Rex
2005 - Magic Ritual 
2006 - Switch On Dark
2009 - Per Viam
2012 - Hystero Demonopathy

References

External links 
 Antonius Rex official website

Musical groups established in 1974
Italian progressive rock groups
Musical groups from Milan
Occult rock musical groups